Louisiana State University (officially Louisiana State University and Agricultural and Mechanical College, commonly referred to as LSU) is a public land-grant research university in Baton Rouge, Louisiana. The university was founded in 1860 near Pineville, Louisiana, under the name Louisiana State Seminary of Learning & Military Academy. The current LSU main campus was dedicated in 1926, consists of more than 250 buildings constructed in the style of Italian Renaissance architect Andrea Palladio, and the main campus historic district occupies a  plateau on the banks of the Mississippi River.

LSU is the flagship school of the state of Louisiana, as well as the flagship institution of the Louisiana State University System, and is the most comprehensive university in Louisiana. In 2021, the university enrolled over 28,000 undergraduate and more than 4,500 graduate students in 14 schools and colleges. Several of LSU's graduate schools, such as the E. J. Ourso College of Business and the Paul M. Hebert Law Center, have received national recognition in their respective fields of study. It is classified among "R1: Doctoral Universities – Very high research activity". LSU is also noted for its extensive research facilities, operating some 800 sponsored research projects funded by agencies such as the National Institutes of Health, the National Science Foundation, the National Endowment for the Humanities, and the National Aeronautics and Space Administration. LSU is one of eight universities in the United States with dental, law, veterinary, medical, and Master of Business Administration programs.

LSU's athletics department fields teams in 21 varsity sports (nine men's, 12 women's), and is a member of the NCAA (National Collegiate Athletic Association) and the SEC (Southeastern Conference). The university is represented by its mascot, Mike the Tiger.

History

19th century
Louisiana State University Agricultural & Mechanical College had its origin in several land grants made by the United States government in 1806, 1811, and 1827 for use as a seminary of learning. It was founded as a military academy and is still today steeped in military tradition, giving rise to the school's nickname "The Ole War Skule". In 1853, the Louisiana General Assembly established the Seminary of Learning of the State of Louisiana near Pineville in Rapides Parish in Central Louisiana. Modeled initially after Virginia Military Institute, the institution opened with five professors and nineteen cadets on January 2, 1860, with Major, later Colonel, William Tecumseh Sherman as superintendent. 

The original location of the Old LSU Site is listed on the National Register of Historic Places. 

On January 26, 1861, when Louisiana became the sixth state to secede from the Union, Sherman resigned his position after only a year at the helm to return north and eventually resume his service in the Union Army.  The school closed on June 30, 1861, after the start of the American Civil War.

During the war, the university reopened briefly in April 1863 but was closed once again with the invasion of the Red River Valley by the Union Army. The losses sustained by the institution during the Union occupation were heavy, and after 1863 the seminary remained closed for the remainder of the Civil War. Following the surrender of the Confederates at Appomattox Court House on April 9, 1865, General Sherman donated two cannons to the institution. These cannons had been captured from Confederate forces after the close of the war and had been used during the initial firing upon Fort Sumter in April 1861. The cannons are still displayed in front of LSU's Military Science/Aerospace Studies Building.

The seminary officially reopened its doors on October 2, 1865, only to be burned October 15, 1869. On November 1, 1869, the institution resumed its exercises in Baton Rouge, where it has since remained. In 1870, the name of the institution was officially changed to Louisiana State University.

Louisiana State University Agricultural & Mechanical College was established by an act of the legislature, approved April 7, 1874, to carry out the United States Morrill Act of 1862, granting lands for this purpose. It temporarily opened in New Orleans, June 1, 1874, where it remained until it merged with Louisiana State University in 1877. This prompted the final name change for the university to the Louisiana State University and Agricultural & Mechanical College.

20th century

In 1905, LSU admitted its first female student, R. O. Davis. She was admitted into a program to pursue a master's degree. The following year, 1906, LSU admitted sixteen female students to its freshman class as part of an experimental program. Before this, LSU's student body was all-male. In 1907, LSU's first female graduate, Martha McC. Read, was awarded a Bachelor of Arts degree. After this two year experimental program, the university fully opened its doors to female applicants in 1908, and thus coeducation was born at LSU.

On April 30, 1926, the present LSU campus was formally dedicated, following the school's history at the federal garrison grounds (now the site of the state capitol) where it had been since 1886. Before this, LSU used the quarters of the Institute for the Deaf, Mute, and Blind. Land for the present campus was purchased in 1918, construction started in 1922, and the move began in 1925; however, the move was not completed until 1932. The campus was originally designed for 3000 students but was cut back due to budget problems. After years of enrollment fluctuation, student numbers began a steady increase, new programs were added, curricula and faculty expanded, and a true state university emerged.

In 1928, LSU was a small-time country school that generated little interest or attention in the state. Labeled a "third-rate" institution by the Association of State Universities, the school had only 1800 students, 168 faculty members, and an annual operating budget of $800,000. In 1930, Huey Pierce Long Jr., the governor, began a massive building program to expand the physical plant and add departments.

By 1936, LSU had the finest facilities in the South, a top-notch faculty of 394 professors, a new medical school, more than 6,000 students, and a winning football team. In only eight years, it had risen in size from 88th in the nation to 20th, and it was the 11th largest state university in the nation. Long financed these improvements by arranging for the state to purchase acreage from the old LSU campus, which adjoined the grounds of the new State Capitol building in downtown Baton Rouge. To the consternation of his critics, Long essentially diverted $9 million for LSU's expansion and increased the annual operating budget to $2.8 million.

LSU was hit by scandal in 1939 when James Monroe Smith, appointed by Huey Long as president of LSU, was charged with embezzling a half-million dollars. In the ensuing investigation, at least twenty state officials were indicted. Two committed suicide as the scandal enveloped Governor Richard W. Leche, who received a 10-year federal prison sentence as a result of a kickback scheme. Paul M. Hebert, Dean of LSU's law school at the time, then assumed interim presidency in Smith's place.

During World War II, LSU was one of 131 colleges and universities nationally that took part in the V-12 Navy College Training Program which offered students a path to a Navy commission.

Although some African-Americans students tried to enroll in LSU in 1946, the university did not admit African-Americans until the 1950s. In 1953 A. P. Tureaud Jr. enrolled under court order, but his enrollment was canceled when a higher court overturned the ruling. His case was ultimately decided by the U.S. Supreme Court. Tureaud returned to LSU in 1956. A classroom building on the LSU campus is named for his father, the late A. P. Tureaud Sr., a noted Civil Rights leader. The federal courts mandated full integration for LSU in 1964. The first African-American graduate of the LSU Law School was New Orleans's first African-American mayor, the late Ernest N. "Dutch" Morial.

In 1969, mandatory ROTC for freshmen and sophomores was abolished; however, LSU continues to maintain Air Force and Army ROTC.
In 1978, LSU was named a sea-grant college, the 13th university in the nation to be so designated. In 1992, the LSU Board of Supervisors approved the creation of the LSU Honors College.

21st century
In the aftermath of Hurricane Katrina, LSU accepted an additional 2,300 displaced students from schools in the greater New Orleans area such as Tulane University, Loyola University New Orleans, Xavier University of Louisiana, and the University of New Orleans. In addition to accepting displaced students, university officials also took on the challenge of housing and managing many hurricane victims, converting the Pete Maravich Assembly Center into a fully functional field hospital. Around 3,000 LSU students volunteered during the months after Katrina, assisting with the administration of medical treatment to some 5,000 evacuees and screening another 45,000 for various diseases.

In 2013, F. King Alexander was named President of Louisiana State University.

In fall 2020, LSU broke its record for the most diverse and largest freshman class in history. Of the record 6,690 freshmen, more than 30% identified as students of color, African-Americans made up the most at 16.8%. Additionally, LSU reached its all-time highest enrollment at 34,290 undergraduate and graduate students.

A November 2020 investigative report in USA Today accused LSU of mishandling sexual misconduct claims against the football players. LSU hired Husch Blackwell LLP to review policies in response to the report. Husch Blackwell released a 262-page report in March 2021 confirming the USA Today story, adding that the problems within LSU went far beyond the allegations detailed in the investigation, with many of the problems being widespread across the university. In the fallout of the report, former LSU Tigers football coach Les Miles and former LSU president F. King Alexander were forced to resign from their jobs at University of Kansas and Oregon State University, respectively. 

In April 2021, seven women filed a federal class-action lawsuit against LSU and its leadership based on their inability to report their incidents to the university's Title IX office. The seven women are six former students (three of which were a part of the women's tennis team at LSU and two who were student employees in the football recruiting office) and one current student. In June 2021, football coach Ed Orgeron was added as a defendant to the Title IX lawsuit, making the claim that Orgeron was aware of and failed to report the rape allegation of former running back Derrius Guice. 

In April 2021, LSU's Assistant Athletic Director of Football Recruiting and Alumni Relations, Sharon Lewis, filed a $50 million federal lawsuit against the university for years of harassment for her attempts to report sexual misconduct allegations against players, coaches, and athletic officials. In January 2022, Lewis' legal team announced the university had violated Louisiana's whistleblower law, Equal Employment Opportunity Commission guidelines, and Title IX as Lewis was fired in retaliation for her lawsuit. In July 2022, it was announced that trial date for Lewis' lawsuit was scheduled for May 22, 2023, while the joint lawsuit filed by the LSU students had a trial date scheduled for June 26, 2023.

Dr. William F. Tate IV was named the new president of the school on May 6, 2021, effective in July. He is the first African-American president in LSU's history.

Campus

History

The LSU campus sits on 1,000 acres (8.1 km2) just south of downtown Baton Rouge. Most of the university's 250 buildings, most of which were built between 1925 and 1940, occupy a 650-acre (2.6 km2) plateau on the banks of the Mississippi River.

The Olmsted Brothers of Brookline, Massachusetts, designed the current campus around 1921 when LSU was planning to move its campus from downtown Baton Rouge. The firm originally designed the campus for up to 3,000 students, but state officials asked the firm to scale the plan back due to budgetary constraints; subsequently, the new plan presented to the state by the Olmsted Brothers centered the campus around a cruciform quadrangle similar to the one on campus today.

For unknown reasons, the Olmsted Brothers firm was dropped from the project, and an architect named Theodore Link, who was well known for designing Union Station in St. Louis, Missouri, took over the campus master plan. Link collaborated with Wilbur Tyson Trueblood on the project but remained faithful to the campus the Olmsted firm had designed. Unfortunately, Link died in 1923 before the plan was completed. New Orleans architects Wogan and Bernard completed Link's work and the campus was dedicated on April 30, 1926.

The first building constructed on the present campus was the Swine Palace, the former livestock barn that is now the Reilly Theater. Most of the buildings that occupy the university's Quad were completed between 1922 and 1925.

Under Huey Long, the governor from 1928 to 1932, LSU "more than doubled its enrollment despite the Great Depression; its standing had risen to Grade A; dormitories and buildings for departments of music, dramatic arts, and physical education had been completed; other buildings were soon to start, and costs of attendance had been lowered within the reach of many."

Because the original campus was designed to accommodate 1,500 students, space is now at a premium at LSU. During the 1990s, LSU officials created a set of design guidelines that call for all newly- constructed buildings to have an Italian Renaissance flavor.

Architecture and landscape
Although the Olmsted firm had originally envisioned a Spanish or Mexican style design for the university, Link designed the campus with tan stucco walls, red-tiled rooftops, and extensive porticoes in an attempt to emulate the architecture of Italian Renaissance architect Andrea Palladio. The design of Hill Memorial Library was loosely based on the Boston Public Library, which was the first public library in the U.S. The flanking academic buildings that formed the rest of the Quad represented the major disciplines at the university, and their placement was modeled after buildings on the University of Virginia's campus, which was designed by Thomas Jefferson.

Nine LSU buildings, including the library and the academic buildings for dairying and physics, were constructed by George A. Caldwell, a native of Abbeville. Caldwell designed twenty-six public buildings in Louisiana.

The campus is known for the 1,200 live oak trees that shade the ground of the university. During the 1930s, landscape artist Steele Burden planted many live oaks and magnolia trees, which are now valued at over $50 million. Many of the azaleas, crepe myrtles, ligustrum, and camellias planted in the quadrangle were added to the campus in the 1970s. Through the LSU Foundation's "Endow an Oak" program, individuals and groups can endow live oaks across the university's campus.

Historic District
Fifty-seven resources on the LSU campus were listed in the  Louisiana State University Historic District on the National Register of Historic Places on September 15, 1988. Forty-six of the enlisted resources were considered contributing buildings and structures.

The campus is protected by the State Capital Historic District Legislation.

The LSU Campus Mounds, which are part of a larger mound group spread throughout the state, are near the northwestern corner of the campus and were built an estimated 5,000 years ago. They were individually enlisted in the National Register of Historic Places on March 1, 1999.

Contributing Properties
The 46 contributing properties of the historic district are:

Campus housing
On-campus housing options include on-campus apartments (East Campus Apartments, West Campus Apartments, Edward Gay and Nicholson Gateway Apartments), Annie Boyd Hall, Evangeline Hall, the Agricultural Residence College, the Engineering Residential College, the Business Residential College, Broussard, Acadian, Beauregard, Blake, Cypress, Herget, Highland, Jackson, LeJeune, McVoy, Miller, Taylor, East Laville, and West Laville.

Other campuses
Other Louisiana State University campuses include the LSU Agricultural Center, Pennington Biomedical Research Center, LSU of Alexandria, LSU Shreveport, LSU Eunice, LSU Health Sciences Center New Orleans and LSU Health Sciences Center Shreveport.

The University of New Orleans was a member of Louisiana State University from 1958 until 1963 as LSUNO and under its own name from 1974 until 2011, when it was transferred to the University of Louisiana System by the Louisiana Legislature.

In addition, LSU owns and operates the J. Bennett Johnston Sr. Center for Advanced Microstructures and Devices (CAMD), which is a 1.3 GeV synchrotron radiation facility.

Academics

Admissions

Undergraduate 

The 2022 annual ranking of U.S. News & World Report categorizes LSU-Baton Rouge as "more selective". For the Class of 2025 (enrolled fall 2021), LSU received 36,561 applications and accepted 25,907 (70.9%). Of those accepted, 7,045 enrolled, a yield rate (the percentage of accepted students who choose to attend the university) of 27.2%. LSU's freshman retention rate is 82.9%, with 69% going on to graduate within six years.

The enrolled first-year class of 2025 had the following standardized test scores: the middle 50% range (25th percentile-75th percentile) of SAT scores was 1130-1300, while the middle 50% range of ACT scores was 23-29.

Colleges and schools

Rankings

Louisiana State University is ranked 176th in the national universities category and 87th among public universities by the 2022 U.S. News & World Report ranking of U.S. colleges. LSU is also ranked as the 192nd best overall university in the nation by Forbes magazine in 2019. Additionally, in 2009, U.S. News & World Report ranked LSU as the 16th most popular university in the nation among high school students.

Programs that have received recognition within LSU include the following:
The university's Robert S. Reich School of Landscape Architecture has been consistently ranked among the best undergraduate and graduate programs by DesignIntelligence for "America's Best Architecture & Design Schools". The journal has ranked the school in the top five since 2004.
The E. J. Ourso College of Business has two professional programs ranked by U.S. News & World Report: in 2015, the Public Administration Institute ranked 73rd nationally according to the magazine, and the Flores MBA program was ranked 65th nationally. Additionally,
 LSU students have won the International Student High Achievement Award, an accolade given to students who score the highest possible score on the Certified Internal Auditor (CIA) exam, seventeen times during the last twenty-one years.
 In 2007, the Flores MBA Program was ranked seventh in the nation "for attracting corporate MBA recruiters who recruit regionally" by The Wall Street Journal.
 The LSU College of Engineering undergraduate program was ranked 91st by U.S. News & World Report, while the graduate program was ranked 94th.
 The Paul M. Hebert Law Center is ranked as the 75th best law school in the nation by the 2010 U.S. News Rankings of Best Law Schools. LSU law graduates have the highest first-time bar passage rate in Louisiana.
 In 2009, Entrepreneur magazine ranked LSU among the top 12 Entrepreneurial Colleges and Universities in the nation.

 The LSU College of Education graduate program was ranked 86th in the nation by U.S. News & World Report.
 The LSU French program, comprising the Department of French Studies and the Center for French and Francophone Studies, is recognized by the Cultural Services office of the French Ambassador to the United States as a centre d'excellence, an honor given to only 15 university French programs in the United States, and is ranked as one of the top 20 undergraduate French programs in the nation.
 The LSU graduate program in fine arts is ranked 62nd in the nation by U.S. News & World Report.
 The LSU graduate program in library and information studies is ranked 27th in the nation by U.S. News & World Report.
 The LSU School of Social Work is ranked 79th in the nation by the 2015 U.S. News & World Report.
The LSU College of Science is the top producer of African American Ph.D. graduates and women graduates in chemistry in the United States.

Libraries

LSU's main library collection, numbering almost three million volumes, is housed in the Library on the main quadrangle of the university. It is both a general use library and a U.S. Regional Depository Library, housing publications from the federal government, United Nations, and United States Patent and Trademark Office. The LSU Libraries belong to the Association of Research Libraries, which includes the top 113 academic libraries in the U.S. and Canada; the Association of Southeastern Research Libraries (ASERL); LYRASIS, which is a merger of the Southeastern Library Network SOLINET with PALINET; and the Louisiana Academic Library Information Network Consortium (LALINC). LSU was among the founding members of the Louisiana Online University Information System (LOUIS) network which provides access to most academic library catalogs in the state. The LSU Libraries' subject strengths include Louisiana materials, sugar culture and technology, Southern history, agriculture, petroleum engineering, plant pathology, natural history, and various aspects of aquaculture including crawfish, wetlands research, and marine biology.

LSU Libraries' U.S. Regional Depository Library and the U.S. Patent Depository Library collections are housed in Middleton Library. The Library has been a depository for federal government publications since 1907 and has a substantial number of U.S. documents issued before and after that time. The Library became a Regional Depository Library in 1964. The Library was designated as an official depository for U.S. Patents in 1981. The patent collection includes all patents issued from 1871 to the present.

The LSU Libraries Special Collections in Hill Memorial Library provides a center for research in the humanities, social sciences, and fine arts. The primary strength of Special Collections resides in the Louisiana and Lower Mississippi Valley Collections, an outstanding integrated collection of materials that document the region's history and culture. It provides rare and early imprints about the exploration and colonization of the region; books on Louisiana subjects; books by Louisiana authors; Louisiana state documents; extensive manuscript collections, which include the personal papers of important individuals in the region's history, including the Long family; records of business, professions, and organizations; and extensive photographic collections. Its collections of rare books, dating back to the fifteenth century, number more than 80,000 volumes and include the E. A. McIlhenny Natural History Collection, which contains many important works in the history of ornithological and botanical illustration, including John James Audubon's Birds of America, Margaret Stones's Flora of Louisiana, and books by Edward Lear, John Gould, Mark Catesby, and Sir Joseph Banks.

Mrs. Ella V. Aldrich Schwing was librarian at LSU, a member of the faculty of the LSU Library School, and a member of the LSU Board of Supervisors. She donated funds for an annual lecture titled, The LSU Libraries Schwing Lecture Series, which began in 1965. Lecturers included Martha Boaz, Ching-chih Chen, John Y. Cole, Richard M. Dougherty, Edward G. Holley, Judith Krug, Clifford Lynch, James G. Neal, Carl Howard Pforzheimer Jr, Benjamin E. Powell and Robert Wedgeworth.

In June 2020, the LSU Board of Supervisors adopted a resolution to remove Troy H. Middleton's name from the university's main library. The decision came amid student protests concerning the racist past of former LSU President Troy H. Middleton, after whom the Library was named. Louisiana Governor John Bel Edwards supported the decision, stating that "[Black] LSU students shouldn’t be asked to study in a library bearing the name of someone who didn’t want them to be LSU students."

Museums

The LSU campus houses eight museums that feature original works by students as well as traveling exhibits by local, national, and international artisans. In addition to the campus museums, LSU runs four museums in the greater Baton Rouge area: The LSU Museum of Art, The LSU Museum of Natural History, The LSU Museum of Natural Science, and the LSU Rural Life Museum.

LSU Museum of Art
The LSU Museum of Art (LSU MOA), in the Shaw Center for the Arts in downtown Baton Rouge, opened in March 2005. The museum manifests a decade-long vision to offer LSU and the Baton Rouge community greater access to its diverse art collection, changing exhibitions, education programs, and special events. The LSU MOA shares the Shaw Center for the Arts with many cultural partners including the LSU School of Art Gallery, LSU's Laboratory for Creative Arts and Technology, the Manship Theatre, and the Community School for the Arts of the Arts Council of Greater Baton Rouge.

LSU MOA first opened in 1962 under the name of The Anglo-American Art Museum in the Memorial Tower on LSU's Baton Rouge campus. The museum and its collection were established through a donation to LSU in 1959 from an anonymous supporter, to research British and continental influences on early American art and culture in the South. The museum's significant collection of American and British portraiture, furniture, and decorative arts grew from this foundation.

LSU Museum of Natural Science
The LSU Museum of Natural Science was founded in 1936, when its first director, George H. Lowery Jr., assembled a few study specimens of birds in a classroom in Audubon Hall. Since its move to Murphy J. Foster Hall in 1950, the museum has continued to expand and is currently one of the nation's largest natural history museums, with holdings of over 2.5 million specimens. As the only comprehensive research museum in the south-central United States, the LSU Museum of Natural Science fulfills a variety of scientific and educational roles at the university, including the generation of new knowledge in the fields of zoology, archaeology, and paleontology through scholarly research based primarily on natural history collections; collection and preservation of research specimens as a resource for study of the Earth's natural history; education of graduate and undergraduate students in academic areas that are most effectively taught in the museum setting; education of the public using exhibits and lecture programs; and assistance to local citizens, wildlife officials, and forensic specialists through identification and consultation services.

LSU Rural Life Museum
The LSU Rural Life Museum has been listed as one of the top outdoor museums in the country. The variety of people who settled in Louisiana made significant and lasting contributions to the state's unique culture and heritage. It is one of the few museums that celebrate the day-to-day lives of early Americans, including Native Americans, French and Spanish settlers, Anglo-Americans, Germans, Africans, and Acadians. The Rural Life Museum features several displays and exhibits on the pre-industrial residents of Louisiana. The permanent collection includes tools, utensils, furniture, and farming equipment. The recreated "working plantation" consists of a complex of buildings authentically furnished to reconstruct all the major activities of life on a typical 19th-century plantation. The museum also serves as a research facility for LSU students engaged in heritage conservation studies.

Louisiana Museum of Natural History
In 1999, the sixteen natural history collections at Louisiana State University in Baton Rouge were designated by the state legislature as the Louisiana Museum of Natural History. Together, these collections hold more than 2.8 million specimens, objects, and artifacts that document Louisiana's rich natural history. These collections are dispersed among six independently administered units on campus, and include the Vascular Plant Herbarium, the Mycological Herbarium, the Lichen Herbarium, the Louisiana State Arthropod Museum, the Palynology Collection, the Mineralogy and Petrology Collections, the Textile and Costume Museum, the Louisiana Geological Survey Log Library and Core Repository, and, within the LSU Museum of Natural Science, the Collection of Amphibians and Reptiles, the Collection of Birds, the Collection of Fishes, the Collection of Genetic Resources, the Collection of Mammals, the Vertebrate Paleontology Collection, the Collection of Microfossils and Invertebrates, and the Anthropological and Ethnological Collections.

Student life

Organizations

There are over 350 student organizations currently active at LSU, including a student government and a total of 36 fraternities and sororities. LSU Student Government, sometimes referred to as LSU SG, is the official student government association of Louisiana State University and Agricultural and Mechanical College. It is the voice of the LSU student body on matters ranging from university administration to parking and transportation. In addition to the roles of advising and advocating, SG controls approximately $5.5 million of student and state funding each year to support student initiatives such as the LSU Student Technology Fee, student organization support through PSIF, ORF, and other funding programs, the Coca-Cola fund for new initiatives, and the SG Newspaper Initiative that provides free copies of The Advocate, Wall Street Journal, and The New York Times. LSU also has an active Society of American Archivists student chapter.

Much like the United States Government, the LSU Student Government is divided into three major branches; Executive, Legislative, and Judicial. LSU SG is headed by the student body president and the student body vice president, elected to office during the spring semester of each academic year. A College Council system is also established to designate members of SG to the duties of representing specific academic colleges. Additionally, a Student Union Board representative is elected each spring to represent student interests and oversee programs, events, and regulations of the LSU Student Union.

Media
The Daily Reveille, the university's student newspaper, has operated since 1887. It publishes five days a week during the fall and spring semesters and twice a week during the summer semester. The paper has a circulation of 11,000 or more. The Daily Reveille, which is funded by advertising and student fees, employs more than 80 students each semester in jobs ranging from writing and editing to design and illustration. The Daily Reveille was recognized for its outstanding coverage in the 2002–2003 school year with a Pacemaker Award from the Associated Collegiate Press and the Newspaper Association of America Foundation, the highest award granted to student publications in the United States. Princeton Review named The Daily Reveille  as the 12th best college newspaper in the nation in its 2008 edition of The Best 361 Colleges. The Daily Reveille won the Editor & Publisher award, or EPpy, in 2008 for best college newspaper Web site. The Society of Professional Journalists named The Reveille "Best All-Around Daily Student Newspaper" in its 2012 Mark of Excellence awards.

KLSU is an FCC-licensed non-commercial educational (NCE) college radio station, public broadcasting with 5,000 watts of power at 91.1 on the FM dial. Radio on the LSU campus began in 1915 when Dr. David Guthrie, a physics professor, patched together a radio transmitter from spare parts. Call letters KFGC were assigned in the early 1920s. In 1924 the station covered the first football game played in Tiger Stadium and thus provided the first broadcast of a football game in the South. In the 1950s, it switched to FM and became the first educational station in the country to broadcast a college opera. And in the 1990s, it was the first college station to stream audio on the Net. The station is on the air 24 hours a day, 7 days a week, with a format of college alternative music and specialty programming. All programming and operations are managed by the student staff.

Broadcasting on campus cable channel 75, Tiger TV shares its production equipment and facilities with the Manship School of Mass Communication and is one of the most modern student television stations in the country.

Greek life
The Greek community at Louisiana State University is composed of 37 organizations, governed by three councils. These groups work together with University, local, and national affiliates to help achieve the goals and ideals their organizations were founded upon. In the 2006–2007 academic year, Greek organizations at LSU contributed over 50,000 hours and $250,000 to community and philanthropic efforts. Students in the LSU Greek community are also active in many areas on campus, outside of their fraternity or sorority. Greek students are active in over 80 student organizations, including Student Government and various honor societies. In celebration of Greek Week during 2008, the LSU Greek community raised over $117,000 and built two houses for Habitat for Humanity. In 2019, 16% of undergraduate men and 27% of undergraduate women were active in LSU's Greek system.

Publications
 LSU Press is a nonprofit book publisher dedicated to the publication of scholarly, general interest, and regional books. It publishes approximately 80 titles per year and continues to garner national and international accolades, including four Pulitzer Prizes. John Kennedy Toole's A Confederacy of Dunces is among its best-known publications.
 Southern Review is a literary journal published by LSU. It was co-founded in 1935 by three-time Pulitzer Prize-winning writer Robert Penn Warren, who served as U.S. Poet Laureate and wrote the classic novel All the King's Men, and renowned literary critic of the New Criticism school, Cleanth Brooks. It publishes fiction, poetry, and essays, with an emphasis on southern culture and history.
 Legacy is a student-run magazine that publishes a variety of feature-length stories. In both 2001 and 2005, it was named the best student magazine in the nation by the Society of Professional Journalists.
 LSU RESEARCH magazine informs readers about university research programs.
 Apollo's Lyre is a poetry and fiction magazine published each semester by the Honors College.
 LSU Alumni Magazine is a quarterly which focuses on Alumni success and current University news sent out to alumni everywhere.
 Gumbo is the university's yearbook, which may be purchased.
 LSU Today magazine keeps faculty and staff updated with university news.
 New Delta Review is a literary quarterly funded by LSU that publishes a wide range of fiction, poetry, and interviews from new, up-and-coming, and established writers.

Athletics

LSU fields teams in 21 varsity sports (9 men's, 12 women's), and is a member of the NCAA (National Collegiate Athletic Association) and the Southeastern Conference.

The 9 men's teams compete in baseball, basketball, cross country, football, golf, swimming and diving, tennis, indoor track and field, and outdoor track and field. The 12 women's teams compete in basketball, beach volleyball, cross country, golf, gymnastics, soccer, softball, swimming and diving, tennis, indoor track and field, outdoor track and field, and volleyball.

The athletics department official nickname is Fighting Tigers, Tigers, or Lady Tigers.

National championships
LSU has won 50 team national championships, 45 of which were bestowed by the NCAA, tying for sixth all-time in total NCAA team national championships. The five football titles were not conferred by the NCAA, as it does not award college football national championships at the Division I-FBS level.

 Baseball – (6): 1991, 1993, 1996, 1997, 2000, 2009
 Men's Basketball – (1): 1935 (pre-NCAA; defeated Pittsburgh in an arranged game)
 Boxing – (1): 1949
 Football – (5): 1908, 1958, 2003, 2007, 2019
 Men's golf – (5): 1940, 1942, 1947, 1955, 2015
 Men's indoor track and field – (2): 2001, 2004
 Women's indoor track and field – (11): 1987, 1989, 1991, 1993, 1994, 1995, 1996, 1997, 2002, 2003, 2004
 Men's outdoor track and field – (5): 1933, 1989, 1990, 2002, 2021
 Women's outdoor track and field – (14): 1987, 1988, 1989, 1990, 1991, 1992, 1993, 1994, 1995, 1996, 1997, 2000, 2003, 2008, 2012 (vacated)

Facilities
LSU's stadiums, arenas and courses include Tiger Stadium ("Death Valley") (football), Alex Box Stadium, Skip Bertman Field (baseball), Bernie Moore Track Stadium (outdoor track), Carl Maddox Field House (indoor track), Highland Road Park (cross country), LSU Natatorium (swimming and diving), LSU Soccer Stadium (soccer), LSU Tennis Complex (tennis), Pete Maravich Assembly Center (PMAC) (basketball, gymnastics, volleyball), Tiger Park (softball) and University Club of Baton Rouge (golf).

LSU's academic center and practice facilities include the LSU Academic Center for Student-Athletes, Charles McClendon Practice Facility (football), LSU Football Operations Center (football), LSU Indoor Practice Facility (football), LSU Basketball Practice Facility (basketball) and LSU Gymnastics Training Facility
(gymnastics).

Tiger Stadium

Although originally nicknamed "Deaf Valley" for its excruciating levels of sound, the nickname "Death Valley" caught on instead. It is legendary for the crowd noise generated by fans. It is the sixth-largest college football stadium in the nation and third-largest stadium in the SEC, holding 102,321 fans after its latest expansion in 2014. The Tiger Stadium atmosphere is generally considered one of the loudest and most electrifying college football experiences in the country. During a nationally televised game against Auburn in 2003, ESPN recorded a noise level of 117 decibels at certain points in the game. In 2007 when the No. 1 ranked Tigers played the No. 9 ranked Florida Gators, the noise level registered at 122 decibels when the Tigers made a come-from-behind win in the final minutes of the game.

A similar sound level resulted in the legendary "Earthquake Game" against Auburn in 1988. LSU won 7–6 when quarterback Tommy Hodson completed a game-winning touchdown pass to running back Eddie Fuller in the waning seconds of the game. The crowd's roar registered on a seismograph, shaking the ground as much as a small earthquake. This reached a magnitude of 4.7.

Rivals
Rivals include the traditional intra-SEC West rivals the Alabama Crimson Tide, Arkansas Razorbacks, Auburn Tigers, Mississippi State Bulldogs, Ole Miss Rebels, Texas A&M Aggies, and the SEC East rival Florida Gators (designated under the SEC's inter-division "designated rival" format). LSU and Arkansas play annually in football, alternating sites between Baton Rouge and Fayetteville (Little Rock from 1994 through 2010). The winner of the game is awarded the "Golden Boot", a gold-plated trophy formed in the shape of the two states. The game was played the Friday after Thanksgiving in 1992, and every year between 1996 and 2013, except 2009, but starting in 2014, the SEC separated LSU and Arkansas on the final weekend of the regular season. The Tigers now play Texas A&M on the final weekend of the regular season, while Arkansas plays Missouri.

LSU and in-state rival Tulane Green Wave battle for the "Tiger Rag", a flag divided evenly between the colors of the two schools. This rivalry was recently suspended after a payout from LSU.

The LSU-Ole Miss game, known as the Magnolia Bowl (a name selected by the student bodies of both schools) has become more formalized over the years, with a large trophy and a large traveling fanbase for both teams present each year. The LSU-Florida rivalry also has major importance as the two schools won three football national championships between 2006 and 2008 (Florida in 2006 and 2008; LSU in 2007). The LSU-Alabama rivalry has become very important in recent years due to the Nick Saban becoming the Coach of Alabama and the two teams' dominance of the SEC's West Division and their matchup in the 2012 BCS National Championship Game (the only time the standalone game featured two teams from the same conference).

Traditions

Mascot

LSU Athletics is represented by its mascot, a live Bengal tiger named Mike the Tiger. LSU is only one of two institutions of higher education in the United States to have a live tiger as their mascot; the other is the University of Memphis. The tiger was named after Mike Chambers, LSU's athletic trainer in 1936, and was bought for $750 from the Little Rock Arkansas Zoo. Mike V reigned from 1990 to 2007 and remained housed in his on-campus habitat until his death due to kidney failure on May 18, 2007, at age 17. Mike VI was an 11-year-old,  tiger acquired from an Indiana big cat sanctuary. Previously known as Roscoe, "Mike VI" is a Bengal-Siberian mix and was officially named Mike on September 8, 2007. He was introduced to fans at the home game against Florida on October 6, 2007. In 2017, LSU officially introduced Mike VII, formerly named "Harvey".

In 2005, a new $3 million Mike the Tiger Habitat was created for Mike between Tiger Stadium and the Pete Maravich Assembly Center. Its amenities include lush plantings, a waterfall, a flowing stream that empties into a wading pond, and rocky plateaus. The habitat has, as a backdrop, an Italianate tower – a campanile – that creates a visual link to the Italianate architectural vernacular of LSU's campus.

Alma mater

The "LSU Alma Mater" was written in 1929 by Lloyd Funchess and Harris Downey, two students who developed the original song and music because LSU's first alma mater was sung to the tune of "Far Above Cayuga's Waters" and was used by Cornell University. The band plays the "Alma Mater" during pregame and at the end of each home football game.

Fight song

"Fight for LSU" is LSU's official fight song. During LSU football games, it is played when the team runs onto the field, after the field goal or extra point is attempted/scored and at the end of each half (though at the end of the first half a recording is played since the band is already on the sidelines and unable to perform it live). Contrary to popular belief, the song "Hey Fightin' Tigers" is not LSU's fight song, however, it is a staple at pep rallies and is often sung by fans before games and after wins.

Louisiana State University Lab School

The university operates the Louisiana State University Laboratory School, a Kindergarten through 12 public school. The school was established by the College of Education of Louisiana State University and has operated under its auspices for over eighty years. This coeducational school exists as an independent system to provide training opportunities for pre- and in-service teachers and to serve as a demonstration and educational research center. Since the school is part of LSU, students are required to pay tuition. The school is on the main campus of Louisiana State University in Baton Rouge. LSU Laboratory School was the first International Baccalaureate Diploma Program school in the state of Louisiana and is adopting the complete K-12 program.

Farm

Hill Farm established in 1927 by the Louisiana Agricultural Experiment Station in order to carry out research horticultural crops as part of Louisiana State University's mission as a land-grant university.

During the 1960s a large part of the Farm's land was reallocated for the construction of sorority houses, as a result, many of the fruit breeding programs had to be moved to other parts of the state. In the 1990s a new student recreation center and playing fields were created on the site of most of the remaining land, the remaining research programs were moved to the Burden Research Plantation. Today five acres of the original Hill Farm remain and used primarily as an agriculture teaching facility and community garden. Individual garden plots are nine by five feet (9' X 5') and may be rented by students, faculty, and the community at large. The price per lot has been deliberately kept low to support the Farm's mission to "provide access to gardening space, education, and resources necessary for the community to grow food in environmentally sustainable ways as a means of creating a food system where locally produced, affordable and nutritious food is available to all, and where the community can come together to share, play, and inspire one another." Although the gardeners are not required to plant certified organic seeds and plants, the Farm requires gardeners to use organic farming methods.

Notable alumni

LSU athletes have gone on to achieve prominence in their respective sports. "Pistol" Pete Maravich played basketball for LSU and was a three-time consensus first-team All-American and 1970 National 'Player of the Year'. Shaquille O'Neal ("Shaq") also played basketball for LSU and received many honors, including being named twice as a first-team Men's Basketball All-American and twice as the SEC Player Of The Year. Billy Cannon played Halfback for LSU and was the first LSU player to win the Heisman Trophy (in 1959), the second being Joe Burrow (in 2019). Cannon was inducted into the College Football Hall of Fame in 2009. JaMarcus Russell, Oakland Raiders quarterback number 1 draft pick of 2007. Professional golfer Johnny Pott, five-time winner on the PGA Tour, was a member of the 1955 NCAA winning golf team. Teammates Alex Bregman and Aaron Nola were both 2018 Major League Baseball All-Stars.

LSU alumni have also been active on both the national and international stage in the fields of politics, academia, and the arts. Such notables include James Carville, who was the senior political adviser to Bill Clinton, and Donna Brazile, the campaign manager of the 2000 presidential campaign of Vice-president Al Gore. Hubert Humphrey, the 38th vice president of the United States, earned a master's degree in political science before becoming the junior United States senator from Minnesota. Linda Thomas-Greenfield, a United States ambassador to the United Nations appointed by President Joe Biden in 2021, earned a BA in 1974. Randy Moffett, president of the University of Louisiana System (ULS) and former president of Southeastern Louisiana University received his Ed.D. from Louisiana State University in 1980. Academy Award-winning actress Joanne Woodward majored in drama during her enrollment at LSU. Author and screenwriter Nic Pizzolatto, creator of True Detective, graduated from LSU with a BA English & Philosophy. Another writer that graduated from LSU was Marcelo Ramos Motta, a noted author on the subject of Thelema. The rock band Better Than Ezra also are LSU graduates.

America's early Space Program benefited from the services of two LSU Graduates. NASA Engineer Maxime Faget was a Naval Reserve Officer and the NASA Engineer responsible for the design of the Mercury Capsule, Apollo Command Module, Capsule Escape Tower System, Mach Meter, and the STS Space Shuttle Orbiter Vehicle and System (STS=Space Transportation System). NASA Pioneer/Founder Walter C. Williams established what is now known as NASA's Dryden Flight Research Center, previously known as Muroc Army Station. Dr. Williams was directly involved with the Bell X-1 program, "Glamorous Glennis", research flights that led to the first crewed flight exceeding the speed of sound in level flight. Dr. Williams was on the Aeronautical Board of NACA and was responsible for hiring many of the "pioneers" of what has now become America's Space Program, NASA. Michael I. Jordan, Professor of Computer Science at UC Berkeley is also an LSU alumnus.

See also

 American Student Dental Association
 Grok (Knowledge Base)
 Highland Road Park Observatory
 Hill Farm Community Garden
 List of forestry universities and colleges
 Louisiana Business Technology Center
 LSU Hilltop Arboretum
 LSU Tiger Trails
 Stephenson Disaster Management Institute
 National Register of Historic Places listings in East Baton Rouge Parish, Louisiana

Notes

References

Further reading

External links

 
 LSU Athletics website
 
 

 
Louisiana State University System
Flagship universities in the United States
Universities and colleges accredited by the Southern Association of Colleges and Schools
Land-grant universities and colleges
Educational institutions established in 1860
Tourist attractions in Baton Rouge, Louisiana
University
Public universities and colleges in Louisiana